The 2016 season will be ÍA's 64th season in the top-flight of Icelandic football.

Gunnlaugur Jónsson will head coach the team for the third season running. He will be assisted by Jón Þór Hauksson.

Along with Úrvalsdeild, ÍA will compete in the Lengjubikarinn and Borgunarbikarinn.

First Team

Transfers and loans

Transfers in

Transfers out

Loans in

Pre-season

Fótbolti.net Cup
ÍA took part in the 2016 Fótbolti.net Cup, a pre-season tournament. The team played in Group 1 along with KR, FH and Þróttur R. ÍA finished second in the group and played Stjarnan for the third place. ÍA won the game 6–1 with Steinar Þorsteinsson scoring a hattrick, earning them the bronze.

Lengjubikarinn
ÍA were drawn in group 3 in the Icelandic league cup, Lengjubikarinn, along with Víkingur R., KR, HK, Grindavík and Haukar. ÍA finished the group in 3rd place and did not qualify for the knockout stages.

Úrvalsdeild

League table

Matches

Results by matchday

Summary of results

Points breakdown
 Points at home: 4
 Points away from home: 0
 6 Points:
 4 Points: 
 3 Points:
 2 Points:
 1 Point:
 0 Points:

Borgunarbikarinn
ÍA was drawn against 1. deild karla team KV in the Round of 32 in the Icelandic Cup, Borgunarbikarinn. ÍA dominated the game but only scored one goal through Þórður Þorsteinn Þórðarson.

Matches

Squad statistics

Goalscorers
Includes all competitive matches.

Goalkeeping
Includes all competitive matches.

Appearances
Includes all competitive matches. Numbers in parentheses are sub-appearances.

Disciplinary
Includes all competitive matches.

Squad Stats
Includes all competitive matches; Úrvalsdeild, Borgunarbikar and Lengjubikar.
{| class="wikitable" style="text-align:center;"
|-
!  style="background:#ffff00; color:black; width:150px;"|
!  style="background:#ffff00; color:black; width:75px;"|Úrvalsdeild
!  style="background:#ffff00; color:black; width:75px;"|Borgunarbikar
!  style="background:#ffff00; color:black; width:75px;"|Lengjubikar
!  style="background:#ffff00; color:black; width:75px;"|Total
|-
|align=left|Games played       || 7 || 1 || 5 || 13
|-
|align=left|Games won         || 1 || 1 || 3 || 5 (39%)
|-
|align=left|Games drawn        || 1 || 0 || 1 || 2 (15%)
|-
|align=left|Games lost         || 5 || 0 || 1 || 6 (46%)
|-
|align=left|Goals scored       || 5 || 1 || 15 || 21
|-
|align=left|Goals conceded     || 14 || 0 || 11 || 25
|-
|align=left|Clean sheets       || 1 || 1 || 1 || 3
|-
|align=left|Yellow cards       || 12 || 1 || 7 || 20
|-
|align=left|Red cards         || 0 || 0 || 2 || 2

References

2016 in Icelandic football
Úrvalsdeild karla (football)
Íþróttabandalag Akraness
Íþróttabandalag Akraness seasons
Akranes